Angel is the second album by American R&B singer-songwriter Amanda Perez, initially released on October 15, 2002 by PowerHowse/Silverstone Records and distributed by Mad Chemistry Distribution. The first release features a larger track listing, including several bonus tracks and one hidden bonus track. Upon switching record labels the album was reconsidered and released by Virgin Records worldwide on February 11, 2003. It features the hit single "Angel", which reached number 3 on the Billboard Pop 100 and topped the New Zealand Singles Chart.

Track listing
October 15, 2002 Release by Mad Chemistry Distribution. All songs composed by Amanda Perez and Mike Quinn (Mike Q.). Additional vocals Mike Q.

Track listing
February 11, 2003 Release by Virgin Records. All songs composed by Amanda Perez and Mike Quinn (Mike Q.). Additional vocals Mike Q.

Personnel
Amanda Perez: Vocals
Mike Q. (Mike Quinn): Additional Vocals, Skit & Writing, Producer, A&R
Yecj Namsorg: Acoustic, Electric, Classical & Spanish Guitars, Bass, Keyboards, Synthesizers
P. Tony: Drum & Beat Programming

Charts

References

Amanda Perez albums
2003 albums